Mertensophryne lindneri (common names: Dar es Salaam toad, Lindners toad, Lindners dwarf toad) is a species of toad in the family Bufonidae. It is found on the coastal lowlands of eastern Tanzania and northern Mozambique to southeastern Malawi, up to  asl. Its habitats are woodlands, thickets, dry forests, farmland, and even rocky outcrops; it tolerates low-intensity cultivation. Its breeding habitat is unknown but presumably includes ponds or streams. It is considered uncommon but also difficult to observe, typically found after heavy rain. The intensification of agriculture and expanding human settlements are considered likely threats to it.

References

lindneri
Frogs of Africa
Amphibians of Malawi
Amphibians of Mozambique
Amphibians of Tanzania
Taxa named by Robert Mertens
Amphibians described in 1955
Taxonomy articles created by Polbot